Paradeigma is a Greek term for a pattern, example or sample; the plural reads Paradeigmata. Its closest translation is "an isolated example by which a general rule illustrated". 

Limited to rhetoric, a paradeigma is used to compare the situation of the audience to a similar past event, like a parable. It offers counsel on how the audience should act. In the Greek tradition many paradeigmata are mythological examples, often in reference to a popular legend or well-known character in a similar position to the audience.

In literature 

Aristotle was a prominent ancient rhetorician who explicitly discussed the use of paradeigmata.

Homer's The Iliad (24.601–619) – Achilles is trying to encourage Priam to eat rather than continue to weep for his dead son Hector. He brings up Niobe, a woman that had lost twelve children but still found the strength to eat. He is trying to counsel Priam to do what he should by using Niobe as a paradeigma, an example to guide behaviour.

Jesus' parables in the New Testament of the Bible – In Luke 7:41–47 Jesus uses the following paradeigmata to explain how much a man loves in response to how much he is forgiven. (Jesus is alluding to the magnitude of his coming sacrifice on the cross for all of mankind’s sin.) 

41 "Two men owed money to a certain moneylender. One owed him five  hundred denarii, and the other fifty. Neither of them had the money to pay him
42 back, so he cancelled the debts of both. Now which of them will love him more?" Simon replied, "I suppose the one who had the bigger debt cancelled."
43 "You have judged correctly," Jesus said. Then he turned toward the woman and said to Simon, "Do you see this
44 woman? I came into your house. You did not give me any water for my feet, but she wet my feet with her tears and wiped them with her hair. You did not give
45 me a kiss, but this woman, from the time I entered, has not stopped kissing my feet. You did not put oil on my head, but she has poured perfume on my feet. 
46 Therefore, I tell you, her many sins have been forgiven—for she loved much.
47 But he who has been forgiven little, loves little."

See also
 Exemplification theory

References

Greek words and phrases
Rhetorical techniques